Ernest Nnaemeka Anyanwu (born 21 August 1988 in Awe) is a Nigerian footballer who plays as a defender for Yobe Desert Stars.

Career
Anyanwu came on 6 February 2007 from University of Lagos to Enugu Rangers. He joined League rival Enyimba F.C. on 26 October 2009 along with teammate  Emeka Emedosi from Rangers.
He was called up in July 2010 for the Nigeria friendly against South Korea.

References

External links
Nnaemeka Anyanwu at Footballdatabase

1988 births
Living people
Nigerian footballers
Association football defenders
Rangers International F.C. players